The XIV Grand Prix de l'Albigeois was a Formula One motor race held on 1 June 1952 at Circuit Les Planques, Albi, France. The race was won by Louis Rosier in a Ferrari 375 Chico Landi was second in another 375 and Yves Giraud-Cabantous third in a Talbot-Lago T26C. BRM drivers Juan Manuel Fangio and José Froilán González took pole and fastest lap respectively, but both retired with mechanical problems.

Classification

Race

References

Albi Grand Prix
Albi Grand Prix
Albi Grand Prix